The Wonderful Wooing is a 1926 British silent drama film directed by Geoffrey Malins and starring Marjorie Hume, G. H. Mulcaster and Genevieve Townsend. It was based on the 1925 novel The Wonderful Wooing by Douglas Walshe. The screenplay concerns a poor man who falls in love with a much richer woman who is already engaged.

Cast
 Marjorie Hume - Edith Dearing
 G. H. Mulcaster - Ronald West
 Genevieve Townsend - Barbara
 Eric Bransby Williams - Martin
 Tom Coventry - Jenkins
 Daisy Campbell - Mrs West

References

External links

1925 films
1925 drama films
British drama films
British silent feature films
British black-and-white films
1920s English-language films
1920s British films
Silent drama films